"All This Time" is the first single from Tiffany's second studio album, Hold an Old Friend's Hand. The single was Tiffany's fourth and last top-ten hit in the United States.

Song information
All This Time, a mid-tempo ballad, was released in 1988 peaking on the Billboard Hot 100 chart at #6 in mid February of 1989 and was also a top-ten hit on the Billboard Adult Contemporary chart. In the UK, "All This Time" served as second single to "Radio Romance", charting in the top 50.

The song was also released several months previously on the Japanese remix EP, I Saw Him Standing There, and the Japanese single edition of "I Saw Him Standing There". It was also released on one of her greatest hits compilations.

Music video
The music video was filmed at Knott's Berry Farm in Buena Park, California. Around 10 p.m., a taxi drops Tiffany at the train station. She walks through the empty boarding area, hugging her chest with her arms and waist. She follows the train as it prepares to stop. She walks into an auditorium and leans against a seat, staring into the spotlight shining on her. On a darkened stage, she performs. The breeze lifts up her hair while she sits on the windowsill in the family room. She rides a carousel alone. Back at the family room, she unwraps some letters tied with a pink bow and reads them. She walks on the stage, looking at the red scarlet red columns and stairs set up for her performance. While the sun sets, she leans against the railing at the pier. On stage, she is filmed through a sepia filter and hazy glass. She raises her hand, feeling the rain drops and walks up the steps to her room. A Charlie Chaplin puppet bounces outside. She walks to Knott's Memory Lane and stands by the fountain. Lit in white, she sits on the windowsill. She stops at Cestrella's and puts in a quarter in the slot. The animatronic fortune teller turns her head to the left. She performs on a strip of film. By the end of the video, she waits at the train station. The fortune from the game reads: "The sun still shines. The sun still sets." until it faded in white.

Track listings and formats
7" single and cassette single

 "All This Time"
 "Can't Stop a Heartbeat"

Chart performance

Weekly charts

Year-end charts

References

Tiffany Darwish songs
1988 singles
Songs written by Steven McClintock
Pop ballads
MCA Records singles
1988 songs
1980s ballads
Songs written by Tim James (musician)